Marsilio is an Italian name most likely to refer to:

Marsilio Ficino (1433–1499), Italian scholar and Catholic priest

It may also refer to:

Marco Marsilio (born 1968), Italian politician
Marsilio da Carrara (1294–1338), Lord of Padua
Marsilio Landriani (bishop) (1528–1609), Roman Catholic prelate and bishop of Vigevano
Marsilio Rossi (1916–1942), Italian sprinter
Marsilius of Padua (1275–1342), Italian scholar